The Irish Experiment is the popular name for the interest, primarily from VFL/AFL clubs, in bringing Irish sportspeople, particularly Gaelic footballers, to Australia to play Australian rules football professionally. The AFL's focus on Gaelic footballers is due to the similarities between the sports.

The Irish Experiment began in the mid-1980s as an informal project of the Melbourne Football Club. Despite its initial success, enthusiasm for the project lapsed until the 2000s, when it again became ongoing, reaching a record level due to globalisation and professionalism in sport; however, it also faced significant challenges due to the COVID-19 pandemic.

The highest-profile product of the experiment to date has been Medal of the Order of Australia and 1991 Brownlow Medal recipient Jim Stynes, who was an early recruit in 1984, during his highly successful career he played more AFL games than any other Irish player. Tadhg Kennelly was the first to win a premiership in 2005. 

Over the years, the Irish experiment has attracted media and public interest in both Ireland and Australia. As of 2022, five men recruited from Ireland reached 100 AFL games, though the majority have returned having experienced minimal success in Australia. Since 2018 Irish women have become a major source of talent for the professional AFL Women's competition, with almost an entire team's worth of players participating in the 2020 season. To date, a handful of these recruits have experienced accolades, including first premiership player Ailish Considine, first Irish All-Australian Orla O'Dwyer and notable goalkicker Cora Staunton.

History
One of the first gaelic footballers to convert to Australian rules was Eugene King, who arrived in Australia in 1956 and was invited to train with the Footscray Football Club however he had difficulty with the shape of the ball and did not make the grade.

Australian Football World Tour
In 1967, Harry Beitzel drew inspiration from watching the 1966 All-Ireland Senior Football Championship final on television and formed an Australian side, nicknamed "The Galahs", to play the game against an Irish side. The next year he organised The Australian Football World Tour, a six-match series with games played against Irish teams in Ireland, the United Kingdom and United States of America. What followed was the beginning of regular interaction between the two codes which was to become the hybrid code of International Rules Football.

Beginnings of the Irish Experiment
Ron Barassi, drawing comparisons between Australian rules football and Gaelic football was of the opinion that Gaelic Footballers could provide a previously untapped pool of potential Australian Rules players. At the time, Australian Rules was, with the introduction of the Sydney Swans, increasing its national focus and emerging from a semi-professional sport to a fully professional one. As a result, wealthy Victorian clubs were scouting the country far and wide for new talent to gain an advantage in the sport's premier competition. In 1982, Barassi (then the Melbourne VFL club coach) and his recruiting team including Melbourne's Barry Richardson travelled to Ireland, looking for young, tall, and talented players.

The first recruit was Sean Wight. Wight was part of an Under 19 VFL premiership side just weeks after his arrival from Ireland in 1983 and was widely hailed for his rapid conversion, though others who joined him had much less success. Further advertising resulted in the recruitment of a "tall, skinny lad", Jim Stynes. Both Wight and Stynes, still very much learning the game, played together in the club's 1987 night premiership. While Stynes captured the Melbourne reserves best and fairest that year, he also involved in an embarrassing event which cast doubts on the Irish experiment. His lack of understanding of the rules arguably cost Melbourne a berth in the 1987 VFL Grand Final. The infamous Preliminary Final incident in which he ran over the mark before the siren made him and the Irish experiment the focus of Melbourne media. The mistake awarded Hawthorn's Gary Buckenara a 15-metre penalty which resulted in a winning goal to qualify for the Grand Final. Despite the setback, Stynes and Wight were both to improve in the following seasons and become regular senior players.

Wight and Stynes both featured in the 1988 VFL Grand Final. However, despite high expectations Melbourne was convincingly thrashed by Hawthorn, then the dominant club of the era. However, Stynes was voted best on field for the Demons.

At the end of the 1988 season, Victoria Football Association (VFA) club Prahran enticed Dermot McNicholl, who had starred in two previous International rules series, to move to Melbourne. Two weeks later, St Kilda drafted him with the 99th selection in the 1988 VFL draft. In the same draft, Melbourne recruited two more Irish players, Jim Stynes' brother Brian and Tom Grehan. McNicholl spent the 1989 season playing for Prahran, before injury forced him to miss the first half of the 1990 season, after which he recovered and made his senior debut for St Kilda. He played three senior games before returning to Ireland to complete his university studies.

A much improved Jim Stynes won the Brownlow Medal in 1991, elevating him in the elite category of players for many years to come. However the rare successes were increasingly seen as "one offs" and other clubs showed little enthusiasm with the "hit-and-miss" strategy. Melbourne, the trailblazer club, was not translating recruitment into on-field success and was fast losing financial resources that were required to sustain international recruitment. As a result, few AFL clubs recruited Gaelic footballers played at the highest level in the 1990s. It was later Stynes' post-playing career as Melbourne president that helped the club eliminate A$5 million in debt in two years, leaving the club A$400,000 in surplus. The Demons had been in debt for thirty years.

Despite the Melbourne Football Club's enthusiasm for the Irish experiment and early success with some Irish players, the majority of players from the Irish Experiment did not fare as well. Most failed to meet expectations, not make VFL level, and many instead returned home to Ireland. Even the recruitment of Jim Stynes' brother Brian yielded just a handful of unimpressive senior games and McNicholl returned home after only 3 matches.

With the increasing professionalism of the AFL competition, some clubs continued to speculate about the overseas talent pool. Kevin Sheedy in particular conducted a series of his own experiments with overseas players from various sporting backgrounds, but did not include Ireland or Gaelic football. Despite generating media publicity, none of these experiments were ultimately successful and increasingly sections of the Australian media began to mock the idea of international recruitment.

2000s revival
The Irish experiment lay dormant for many years until Melbourne once again began to take an interest in it. The Sydney Swans followed with the recruitment of Tadhg Kennelly through its rookie list. Kennelly was an almost overnight success, being nominated for the AFL Rising Star award in his first season and widely hailed by the media. As a result, other clubs began to show a much keener interest in Irish talent.

With access to additional resources, AFL clubs began to spend more time and effort in identifying and training athletic and talented rookies. Collingwood, Carlton and Brisbane in particular began to show an interest and to hold scouting sessions and tryouts for Irish players.

Carlton followed and its experiments with Setanta and Aisake Ó hAilpín began to bear fruit and attract significant media interest in both Australia and Ireland. These experiments were of particular note, as for the first time a club was looking to other sports than Gaelic football, by identifying talented hurling athletes with the right ingredients to become AFL players.

With Gaelic footballer Colm Begley's rapid conversion at Brisbane and Martin Clarke's successful AFL debut, media commentators hailed a new era for the Irish experiment. During the 2007 AFL season several AFL clubs began sending talent scouts to Ireland.

In March 2008, it was revealed by the media that the AFL had considered a radical proposal to launch an Irish-dominated team in Sydney's western suburbs, which would perform before an international audience under the Celtic brand name. The "Sydney Celtics" plan was first put to AFL chief executive Andrew Demetriou in early 2007 by Gaelic Players Association executive Donal O'Neill. It was said that the proposal originated at the International Rules Series in Ireland in late 2006, where O'Neill put forward a plan to purchase an AFL licence in Sydney. However, the AFL later dismissed it as simple speculation.

Mid 2008, the interest of clubs reached a peak and Tadhg Kennelly and Jim Stynes spoke out about the increasing recruitment activity. AFL player manager Ricky Nixon set up recruitment networks in Ireland to complement those already in place by clubs such as Collingwood, Carlton and Brisbane. Nickey Brennan, GAA boss spoke out against the recruitment activity in June 2008. The AFL and GAA had ongoing discussions about putting limits on the recruitment of players.

Despite the rise of former hurler Setanta Ó hAilpín in the AFL, recruitment interest in Ireland began to wane in mid-2010. Several Irish players cancelled their rookie contracts to return home, others were delisted after brief bouts in the various state leagues.

2010-2015: AFL turns to other sources of talent
With a media circus surrounding the conversion of professional Australian rugby league players Karmichael Hunt to the Gold Coast Football Club and Israel Folau to the Greater Western Sydney Giants focus began to shift to other sports, particularly rugby football as a potential source of talent. With the success of Canadian rugby union player Mike Pyke's conversion and many other players transitioning at junior level the AFL and commentators began to speculate that professional rugby league players might make an easier transition to the AFL due to coming from a high-contact professional sport involving an oval ball. The transition of two highly publicised rugby league players has since proved to be of little success, and the cross/code focus of AFL recruiters has returned to the GAA and expanded to include American professional sportsmen.

In particular, the first AFL International Combine was held in the United States targeting college basketballers and college footballers was particularly successful, eventually producing such AFL listed Americans as: Eric Wallace, Jason Holmes and Mason Cox.

Revival and European Combine 2015–2020
In 2015, the AFL appointed Tadhg Kennelly, a former player for the Sydney Swans as its International Talent Manager and in addition to the US Combine Kennelly organised a special European Combine to be held in Dublin. As expected, the large proportion of the turn out were Gaelic footballers. The two best-performing participants at the combine are then given the opportunity to attend the AFL National Combine. Sean Hurley, Paddy Brophy, Daniel Flynn, Ciarán Byrne, Ciarán Sheehan and Cian Hanley are some notable people who have previously attended the combine.

In 2018, the Irish contingent in the AFL consisted of five senior-listed players and six rookie-listed players.

The 2020 AFL Grand Final featured two players: Zach Tuohy and Mark O'Connor. Both were playing for Geelong but the team lost the game to Richmond.

Damage inflicted by the 2020 Conor McKenna coverage
On 20 June 2020, Conor McKenna of Essendon tested positive for the highly infectious novel coronavirus disease COVID-19. This resulted in the postponement of the match scheduled for the following day between Essendon and Melbourne. One other player was quarantined due to close contact during training. McKenna had another COVID-19 test on 22 June which was confirmed as negative in the evening of 23 June. He remained in quarantine pending a further test later in the week. During this time McKenna was subjected to an intense trial by media, abuse on social media and became a public villain in the country, treatment which provoked much criticism. On 8 September 2020, McKenna announced his retirement and return to Ireland after 79 games played. Geelong footballer Zach Tuohy described the official and media abuse directed at McKenna as "disgraceful" and "outrageous". In Ireland, it was also suggested "stars of the future that may being tempted to pursue a life in the AFL Down Under, may reconsider".

List of Irish sportsmen linked with the VFL/AFL
This list includes any player who at minimum (regardless of whether he ever went to Australia or played actual VFL/AFL matches) meets any one of the following criteria:

a) brought to Australia by an AFL club
b) spent time training with an AFL club
c) played in an AFL club's affiliated state league club or AFL practice match
d) offered an AFL contract by a club
e) listed on an AFL rookie or senior list

Notable players
The following players from the Irish experiment have either played a VFL/AFL game, or are currently on an AFL list.

Other
The following players have been connected with a VFL/AFL club, but never played a senior game.

AFLW
As of 2018/2019 the AFLW was actively recruiting ladies Gaelic footballers primarily due to the success of Laura Duryea who originally found success in the sport while travelling in Australia, and recent increase in the success rate of the men's programs.

References

See also
 List of players who have converted from one football code to another
 Comparison of Australian rules football and Gaelic football
 Australian rules football in Ireland

Comparison of Gaelic football and Australian rules football
History of Australian rules football
Gaelic football
Lists of players of Australian rules football
Lists of Gaelic football players